Big Byrd: The Essence Part 2 is an album by the American jazz pianist Ahmad Jamal, containing performances recorded in Paris in 1994 and New York in 1995 and released on the Birdology label.

Critical reception
Richard S. Ginell, in his review for AllMusic, stated: "Into his mid-60s, Jamal remained as distinctive and inventive a pianist as ever, with delightful surprises lurking around every bend".

Track listing
All compositions by Ahmad Jamal unless noted.
 "Lament" – 8:59 
 "There's a Lull in My Life" (Mack Gordon, Harry Revel) – 6:38 
 "Manhattan Reflections" – 8:35 
 "Big Byrd" – 15:13 
 "Jamie My Boy" – 9:36 
 "I Love You" (Cole Porter) – 8:30

Personnel
Ahmad Jamal – piano
James Cammack – bass (tracks 1, 2, 5 & 6)
Jamil Nasser – bass (tracks 3 & 4)
Idris Muhammad – drums 
Manolo Badrena – percussion
Joe Kennedy, Jr. – violin (track 3)
Donald Byrd – trumpet (track 4)

References 

Verve Records albums
Ahmad Jamal albums
1996 albums